Rene Lucien Le Miere (born 28 February 1952) was a judge of the Supreme Court of Western Australia. He migrated to Western Australia from Jersey in 1965, with his family. In 1978 he was admitted to practise as a barrister in Western Australia and joined the WA Bar Association in 1988, was appointed Queen's Counsel in 1993. He was a member of the Law Society 1983–91, and served as president from 1989–90. Le Miere was appointed to the Supreme Court of Western Australia in 2004. As mandated by the Judges’ Retirement Act, he retired from the Supreme Court when he reached the age of 70 in February 2022. Following his retirement, Le Miere continued working as a private mediator and arbitrator at Quayside Chambers.

He was educated at Aquinas College, Perth and the University of Western Australia.

References

External links
 Supreme Court of Western Australia

1952 births
Living people
People educated at Aquinas College, Perth
People from Saint John, Jersey
Australian King's Counsel
Judges of the Supreme Court of Western Australia